Disc integration, also known in integral calculus as the disc method, is a method for calculating the volume of a solid of revolution of a solid-state material when integrating along an axis "parallel" to the axis of revolution. This method models the resulting three-dimensional shape as a stack of an infinite number of discs of varying radius and infinitesimal thickness. It is also possible to use the same principles with rings instead of discs (the "washer method") to obtain hollow solids of revolutions. This is in contrast to shell integration, which integrates along an axis perpendicular to the axis of revolution.

Definition

Function of 

where  is the distance between the function and the axis of rotation. This works only if the axis of rotation is horizontal (example:  or some other constant).

Function of 

where  is the distance between the function and the axis of rotation. This works only if the axis of rotation is vertical (example:  or some other constant).

Washer method
To obtain a hollow solid of revolution (the “washer method”), the procedure would be to take the volume of the inner solid of revolution and subtract it from the volume of the outer solid of revolution. This can be calculated in a single integral similar to the following:

For example, the next figure shows the rotation along the -axis of the red "leaf" enclosed between the square-root and quadratic curves: 

The volume of this solid is:

One should take caution not to evaluate the square of the difference of the two functions, but to evaluate the difference of the squares of the two functions.

(This formula only works for revolutions about the -axis.)

To rotate about any horizontal axis, simply subtract from that axis from each formula. If  is the value of a horizontal axis, then the volume equals

The bounds of integration are the zeros of the first equation minus the second.

The same idea can be applied to both the -axis and any other vertical axis. One simply must solve each equation for  before one inserts them into the integration formula.

See also
Solid of revolution
Shell integration

References

Frank Ayres, Elliott Mendelson. Schaum's Outlines: Calculus. McGraw-Hill Professional 2008, . pp. 244–248 (. Retrieved July 12, 2013.)

Integral calculus
Volume